Sussaba is a genus of parasitoid wasps belonging to the family Ichneumonidae.

The species of this genus are found in Europe and America.

Species:
 Sussaba atra Manukyan, 1988
 Sussaba balteata Dasch, 1964

References

Ichneumonidae
Ichneumonidae genera